Lawrence Michael Newell CBE (born England) was a prominent Papua New Guinean lawyer, and Chancellor of the Anglican Church of Papua New Guinea.

A member of various government committees on law-related subjects, he also served as the Registrar of the Supreme and National Court of Papua New Guinea.

Prior to working in Papua New Guinea, Newell worked as a missionary in Rwanda, Africa. He was awarded with a CBE for his work in Administration of Courts and Law in the Papua New Guinea and the South Pacific.

Lawrence Newell was born in England and is the elder son of Ronald and Margaret Newell and brother of Martin John Newell.

External links
Anglican Commission Legal Advisers Network

Year of birth missing (living people)
Living people
British emigrants to Papua New Guinea
Papua New Guinean lawyers
Papua New Guinean religious leaders
Anglican missionaries in Rwanda
Papua New Guinean Anglicans
British Anglican missionaries
Commanders of the Order of the British Empire
British expatriates in Rwanda